Newy 87.8 FM (call sign: 2NN) is a narrowcast FM radio station targeting Classic Hits music enthusiasts across Newcastle and The Central Coast, Australia on a frequency of 87.8 MHz. The station plays 50s 60s 70s and some 80s music. The station also produces online video content covering local events.

The station's playout facility is at 1A McIntosh Drive Mayfield West with remote studios located at Beaumont St Hamilton, Newcastle West, Elermore Vale, Tamworth and Penrith. The station transmits from a number of FM transmitters across Newcastle & The Central Coast which are networked via the Optus D2 and Intelsat 19 satellites

History
2NN Classic Hits FM was founded by Craig Allen and first went to air in 2014. It was a part of a national network of narrowcast radio stations playing classic hits music. The network included Classic Hits stations in Orange, Wollongong, Mudgee, Mid North Coast, Bowral, Wagga Wagga, Taree and Roma in Queensland. There were other branding variations on the network including Oldies FM and Air FM in Penrith and a shortwave radio station called Ozyradio

Hunter TV was formed in 2014 with the intent to gain a community television licence to broadcast on free-to-air digital terrestrial television in Newcastle, with the station going live online on 1 March 2014. However, their initial application for a community television licence from the Australian Communications and Media Authority, and later appeals, were rejected due to uncertainty surrounding the future of community television. Hunter TV later reinforced their online services, becoming a community-orientated live streaming and video on demand service.

In September 2020 2NN split from the Classic Hits FM network and merged with Hunter TV forming a new station 'Newy 87.8 FM'. The merged entity creates audio content for radio and video content for their video on demand service.

In 2022 coverage was extended to Gosford and the station plans to extend this further South through the North Shore and Northern Beaches of Sydney in 2023.

Stars of Newcastle
Hunter TV was one of the founding partners who helped launch the Cancer Council's 'Stars of Newcastle' event by promoting and producing video content for the initiative. Hunter TV also provided project management and consulting services to the event organisers. During Hunter TV's tenure, the event raised over $465,000 for the charity.

Current On-Air Schedule 
 'Drive' with Darren McErlain 4pm to 6pm, 7 days a week
 AIR News National and state bulletins; mornings, midday, drive and midnight
 'Webby's Wireless Show' incorporates 'On this day' and 'It's a funny old world' which airs at various times throughout the day.
 'Feel Good Weekends' with Matt Morris, Saturday and Sunday 6pm to 9pm
 'Afternoons' with Paul Rothapfel, 1pm to 4pm weekdays.
 'Saturday Mornings' with Diana Lampard, 9am to 1pm Saturdays.

Former branding (2014-2020)

References

External links 
 Newy Website

Radio stations in Newcastle, New South Wales
Radio stations established in 2014